Fencing at the 2005 Southeast Asian Games took place at the Pasig Sports Center at the City Hall Complex in Pasig, Metro Manila, Philippines. Ten gold medals were awarded in individual and team events further divided into three separate categories: Épée, Foil and Sabre.

Summary

Medal winners

External links
Southeast Asian Games Official Results

2005 Southeast Asian Games events
2005
Fencing competitions in the Philippines
2005 in fencing